The 2021–22 Villanova Wildcats women's basketball team represented Villanova University in the 2021–22 NCAA Division I women's basketball season. The Wildcats, led by 2nd-year head coach Denise Dillon, play their home games at the Finneran Pavilion and are members of the Big East Conference.

Roster

Schedule

|-
!colspan=9 style=| Exhibition

|-
!colspan=9 style=| Regular season

|-
!colspan=9 style=| Big East Women's Tournament

|-
!colspan=9 style=| NCAA Women's Tournament

Rankings

See also
 2021–22 Villanova Wildcats men's basketball team

References

Villanova Wildcats women's basketball seasons
Villanova
Villanova
Villanova
Villanova